Joseph Edouard Oum Ndeki  (8 May 1976 – 7 March 2009 in Rhodes) was a Cameroonian footballer who last played for Rodos.He started his career  in high school where he played for Lycée de New bell soccer team and  quickly captioned the attention of national league recruiters.He was forced to quit high school and his first contract with Union Sportive  De Douala, a division one team based in Douala. His professional career in Cameroon led him to play for Mount Cameroon FC and Coton Sport de Garoua where he was discover by Cameroon  National Team Coach Pierre Le  Chantre who granted him his first selection with the National Team.

Club career
Oum Ndeki had a spell with Ankaragücü in the Turkish Süper Lig. He also played several seasons in Greece for Achaiki, Atsalenios, Diagoras and Rodos.

During his 4.5 years in Greece he played 125 games in the Third Division scoring 52 goals.

International career
Oum Ndeki made an appearance for the senior Cameroon national football team during a 2000 African Cup of Nations qualifying match in 1999.

Personal
His brother, Jean-Paul Ndeki, is also a professional footballer who played in Germany and Latvia.

Death 
He died suddenly on Saturday 7 March 2009 in a Rhodes hospital after suffering from hepatitis. He left behind two children, a boy and girl.

References

1976 births
2009 deaths
Cameroonian footballers
Cameroon international footballers
MKE Ankaragücü footballers
Rodos F.C. players
Association football midfielders